Ajam may refer to:
 Ajam, Bushehr
 Ajam Rural District, in Kohgiluyeh and Boyer-Ahmad Province

See also
 Ajami, Iran (disambiguation)